George Josephs Daly (July 28, 1887 – December 12, 1957), nicknamed "Pecks", was a Major League Baseball pitcher who played for the New York Giants in its 1909 season. He attended St. Bonaventure University.

External links

1887 births
1957 deaths
Major League Baseball pitchers
Baseball players from Buffalo, New York
New York Giants (NL) players
Bay City (minor league baseball) players
Springfield Senators players
St. Bonaventure Bonnies baseball players